The Paul Rusch Cup is awarded annually to the most outstanding player in American football in Japan.

Winners

Trophies won by school/team

See also
 Paul Rusch

References

External links
  (Japanese)

American football in Japan
Awards established in 1984
1984 establishments in Japan